Herndon Hall, also known as the Bergmann Mansion, is an historical residential building located in Des Moines, Iowa, United States.   The house was built in 1881 in the Queen Anne style.  It was designed by the Des Moines architectural firm of Foster & Liebbe for attorney Jefferson Polk.  He named the house after his wife, Julia Herndon.  Over the years it has been the home of three bishops of the Diocese of Des Moines, a clothing store, and it served as the National Headquarters for Better Homes & Gardens Real Estate Service. It now houses a cosmetic & reconstructive surgery practice   It was listed on the National Register of Historic Places in 1977.

References

Houses completed in 1881
National Register of Historic Places in Des Moines, Iowa
Houses on the National Register of Historic Places in Iowa
Houses in Des Moines, Iowa
Queen Anne architecture in Iowa
1881 establishments in Iowa